Jeffrey Vincent Parise is an American actor and artist. Some of his more notable roles include Asmodeus in Supernatural, Carlos Rivera  and Carlos' twin brother Joe Rivera on the ABC soap opera General Hospital,  and Wayne in Anna Biller's horror-thriller film The Love Witch.

Career

Acting
Parise made his acting debut in 1994 on the television series Sisters where he played the role of Dwayne. After that he entered the Los Angeles theatre scene in a string of plays, including Jerusalem Avenue, written and directed by Christopher Joyce. He then appeared in many short and feature-length films and television series. His films include The Unscarred (2000), Over My Dead Body  (2002), 5 Card Stud (2002), Don't Come Knocking (2005) directed by Wim Wenders, Land of Plenty (2004), Dark Reel (2008), Body Politic (2009), and The Face of Love (2013). In 2007, he landed a lead role of Tony in Callback: the Unmaking of Bloodstain, directed by Eric M. Wolfson, for which he won three Best Actor awards for his performance. In 2008 Parise wrote, directed, and starred in the short film Vincent & Lucian.

Parise has been active on television. He played Nick on the television series Cupid  from 1998 to 1999, and he has guest-starred on Turks, Millennium, CSI: Crime Scene Investigation, CSI:NY (playing two different characters five years apart), Walker, Texas Ranger, Titans, NYPD Blue, Monk, Judging Amy, The District, Veronica Mars, Party Down, Burn Notice, and Castle. In 2007-2008 he was cast in Days of Our Lives playing the role of Detective Sullivan in 10 episodes. Parise joined the cast of General Hospital in 2013, playing the role of bad boy Carlos Rivera. He made his debut on September 19, 2013 and continued his run through 2016, after which he returned to the series as Carlos' twin brother, Joe Rivera.
Parise appeared in the final episode of Mad Men, where he played Vince, the guru.  Parise uttered the last spoken words of the iconic series.

Recent roles include Wayne in Anna Biller's acclaimed horror-thriller film The Love Witch, Carlos Camacho in the TV Series The Detour created by Jason Jones and Samantha Bee, and Asmodeus in the award-winning television series Supernatural.

Artist
Parise is an artist, who began painting in 1996. He got his book published, called "A Decade of Paintings 2000-2010", which contains his work,  and writings from the people he has painted as well as from himself. He exhibits his works in Los Angeles galleries and art/music festivals throughout California. He also performed the drumbrella with the William Earth Harp Ensemble on the 2012 season of America's Got Talent where they came in 3rd.

Filmography

Awards and nominations

References

External links

 

American male soap opera actors
American male television actors
American male voice actors
Living people
20th-century American painters
American male film actors
American portrait painters
20th-century American male actors
21st-century American male actors
21st-century American painters
Year of birth missing (living people)